Aliceia simplicissima is a species of sea snail, a marine gastropod mollusk in the family Raphitomidae.

Description

Distribution
This marine species occurs off Zanzibar, Western Sumatra, Indonesia and in the Arafura Sea at depths of 356–470 m.

References

 Thiele J., 1925. Gastropoden der Deutschen Tiefsee-Expedition. In:. Wissenschaftliche Ergebnisse der Deutschen Tiefsee-Expedition auf dem Dampfer "Valdivia" 1898–1899 II. Teil, vol. 17, No. 2, Gustav Fischer, Berlin
 Alexander Sysoev, Mollusca Gastropoda: New deep-water turrid gastropods (Conoidea) from eastern Indonesia; Alain CROSNIER & Philippe BOUCHET, (coordonné par). Résultats des Campagnes MUSORSTOM, Volume 16. Mém. Mus. natn. Hist, nat., 172: 325–355. Paris .

External links
 Biolib.cz : image

simplicissima
Gastropods described in 1925